Geraldine “Gerri” Granger is an American actress and soul singer.

Gerri Granger was a musical guest on the Johnny Carson show from 1962, in the 1969 series, 1973, 1974 and 1977 series. She also guested on The David Frost Show (1969), and ABC-TV's What's It All About World?.

Granger released one album Add A Little Love and had a minor hit with a cover of the Frankie Valli standard "Can't Take My Eyes Off You" 1967. She also recorded an answer song to Return to Sender - "Don't Want Your Letters", arranged and conducted by Bert Keyes.

Her song "I Go To Pieces (Everytime)" became massive on the U.K.'s Northern Soul Scene, despite only being released as a promo in the U.S.A. on the Bell Records label in 1971.  Billboard listed it for release in February, however it was not officially released.

Discography
"Ain't it Funny" 1962

References

Living people
Date of birth unknown
Year of birth missing (living people)